Carlos Daniel Auzqui is an Argentine professional footballer who plays as a winger for Hungarian club Ferencvárosi TC.

Career
On 12 February 2022, Auzqui signed for Nemzeti Bajnokság I club Ferencvárosi TC.

References

External links
 
 
 
 
 
 

1991 births
Living people
Sportspeople from Buenos Aires Province
Argentine footballers
Association football midfielders
Argentine Primera División players
Nemzeti Bajnokság I players
Estudiantes de La Plata footballers
Club Atlético River Plate footballers
Talleres de Córdoba footballers
Ferencvárosi TC footballers
Argentine expatriate footballers
Argentine expatriate sportspeople in Hungary
Expatriate footballers in Hungary